The Hoka Hey Motorcycle Challenge is a motorcycle endurance challenge. Entry is limited to riders of American-made V-twin-style motorcycles.
It is named after a rallying call of the Sioux Indians and is designed to test the participants’ physical, mental and emotional boundaries.

The inaugural 2010 challenge took participants along a mandatory route on back roads across the United States and Canada. The route crossed numerous mountain ranges, 33 Indian reservations, 25 national forests, eight deserts and six national parks. 
Challenge routes travel secondary roads with directions revealed at a series of specific checkpoints. The event guidelines prohibit speeding and require contenders to sleep outside throughout the entire course.

2010 race 

It began in Key West, Florida on June 20 and ended in Homer, Alaska on July 4, 2010. Event organizers named the event after  the Lakota language battle cry of legendary Sioux warrior, Crazy Horse, meaning "Let's go!" (and not "It’s a good day to die", as some have long thought).

Approximately 600 riders participated in the event and all were required to ride Harley-Davidson motorcycles. The exact route, which traveled primarily over secondary roads through some of the country's greatest scenic, historic and cultural spots, was revealed to riders at a series of checkpoints.

The poor economy impacted the anticipated number of participants in the 2010 Hoka Hey. With approximately half of the anticipated registrants, organizers had to dip into their own pockets to cover event expenses, as well as the $500,000 purse. As a result, no net proceeds were available to share with eight named non-profits as originally planned. The non-profits did, however, benefit from additional exposure by being associated with the 2010 Challenge and ancillary fundraising events undertaken by Hoka Hey challengers have contributed to still other charitable causes.

Less than twenty four hours into the event there had been three separate crashes involving Hoka Hey participants on the same stretch of highway. One man had to be airlifted to a hospital due to multiple leg fractures. Numerous riders complained that the maps they were given did not match the actual roads, that signs marking the routes were missing, and that the rules governing the race seemed to be engineered to make it impossible for anyone to claim the prize. Hoka Hey organizers acknowledge that the directions were difficult to follow and reminded riders that they have always said they "would not just give the prize money away."

Six days into the event participant Charles C. Lynn died in an accident in Wyoming, when he lost control of his bike and crashed into a drainage ditch. He was not wearing a helmet.

Eight days into the event, on June 28, riders Frank Kelly and Will Barclay crossed the finish line in Homer simultaneously  with a total time of 190 hours and 20 minutes. The two men stated that they did not wish to get into a dangerous "road duel" and so they resolved to cross the line together. Race officials insisted on a battery of checks before declaring a winner, including drug testing, checking for speeding tickets during the event, and even a lie detector test.

On July 1, one of the challengers struck and injured two bicyclists on the Parks Highway who were training to participate in several triathlons. The cyclists sustained several injuries and the challenge participant, Vik Livingston, sustained serious injuries, including a punctured lung, and was hospitalized. Livingston was observed not to have applied the brakes at all before the crash, which is consistent with accidents involving drivers that have fallen asleep. Alaska State Troopers collected a blood sample for testing.

On July 2, a formal complaint against the race organizers was filed  with the Florida Attorney General's office, against event organizer Jim Durham, also known as Jim Red Cloud, alleging that the event was fraudulent and that Red Cloud had admitted to the riders that part of the purpose for the event was to raise money for water wells and infrastructure reservations. Red Cloud did not communicate directly with the press or the riders during most of the event.

On the thirteenth day of the event, approximately 110 riders had arrived in Homer, including several female riders and at least one husband and wife team.

On July 4, participant Kenneth J. Green died in a crash on the Glenn Highway, which was not part of the prescribed route of the race. Green was apparently aware he would not win and was taking a shortcut. He was not wearing a helmet and was ejected from his bike in the crash and declared dead at the accident scene.

Despite repeated claims that a winner would be declared and the prize money awarded at the Fourth of July event in Homer, no winner was declared and no prize money was evident. Event organizers claimed that they were waiting for potential winners to take polygraph tests and that the prize would now be awarded during the Sturgis Motorcycle Rally.
During Jim Red Cloud's address to the crowd at the Fourth of July celebration, it was revealed that the Hoka Hey Challenge would be run again in 2011, but would have a very different route and different organizers. At least two riders got married at the end of the event, including one rider who had special dispensation for his fiancée to ride with him the entire trip.

Despite being announced as the official winner, apparently because his front tire was slightly in front of Kelly's at the finish, Barclay agreed to honor their commitment to share the prize money, which was awarded to Barclay by Jim Durham in a ceremony at the Sturgis Motorcycle rally.

Publicists for the Hoka Hey 2010 characterized it as a success despite the various problems.

2011

The 2011 event began August 5, 2011 in Mesa, Arizona and ended in Nova Scotia on August 21.   The entry fee was $1,000 and riders had to be at least 18 years of age to participate.  Two days of pre-race activities and events beginning August 3 in Mesa, Arizona. The race departed at 6:00am on August 5 and covered  through 48 states and Canada. There were celebrations and sponsor recognition at each of the 15 check points. An official Hoka Hey Challenge 2011 Road Glide was commissioned by Harley-Davidson was displayed in the Harley-Davidson Museum located in Milwaukee, Wisconsin. Additional events took place when riders arrived in Nova Scotia.

The 2011 Hoka Hey Motorcycle Challenge was directed by an organizing committee composed of various professionals and event stakeholders. A documentary, featuring footage and stories from the 2010 Challenge is in development.

2014
In 2014 the event returned to its original concept of a race from Key West, Florida to Homer, Alaska. The race began on Sunday, July 20.

See also
List of long-distance motorcycle riders

References

External links

Motorcycle races
Long-distance motorcycle riding
Cross-border races